The 2015 LA Galaxy season was the club's twentieth season of existence, and their twentieth consecutive season in Major League Soccer, the top tier of American soccer.

The Galaxy entered the season as the defending MLS Cup champions. They finished fifth in the Western Conference during the 2015 MLS regular season and were eliminated by Seattle Sounders FC in the Knockout Round of the playoffs. The team qualified for the 2015–16 CONCACAF Champions League by virtue of winning MLS Cup 2014. The Galaxy reached the quarterfinals of the U.S. Open Cup before being eliminated by Real Salt Lake.

Players

Squad information

Transfers

Transfers in

Transfers out

Competitions

Friendlies

Major League Soccer

Standings

Western Conference

Overall

Regular season

MLS Cup Playoffs

Knockout round

U.S. Open Cup

Fourth round

Fifth round 
The draw for this round was held on June 18.

Quarterfinal

CONCACAF Champions League

Group stage 

The LA Galaxy have been drawn into Group D. The full tournament schedule was announced on June 29, 2015.

Standings

Matches 
All times U.S. Eastern Daylight Time (UTC−4)

International Champions Cup 

Matches announced on April 28.

See also 
 2015 in American soccer
 2015 LA Galaxy II season

References

External links 
 

LA Galaxy seasons
LA Galaxy
LA Galaxy
LA Galaxy